Gromada is a video game developed by Russian studio Buka Entertainment and published by Bethesda Softworks. The game is an arcade shooter.

Development
The game was announced in April 1999. It was scheduled to release in Q2 1999.

Reception

Game Industry News gave the game a 4.5 of 5 stating " All the categories—sound, graphics, gameplay, controls, story, and even entertainment—are simple enough for kids to enjoy but still interesting enough to keep older gamers intrigued and working their way through each arena of Gromada.

Game industry News nominated Gromada as a finalist for its Family Entertainment Game of the Year award.

References

2000 video games
Alien invasions in video games
Bethesda Softworks games
Run and gun games
Science fiction video games
Tank simulation video games
Top-down video games
Video games developed in Russia
Video games set on fictional planets
Windows games
Windows-only games
Buka Entertainment games